Evans Augustine Adotey (born 24 September 1964) is a Ghanaian football team manager who currently coaches Ghana Premier League side Karela United. He previously coached Ghana women's national under-17 football team and served as technical director for Medeama SC.

Coaching career

Medeama SC 
Adotey joined Medeama in 2013 as an assistant coach. In March 2013, he was appointed as interim coach and lead the club to their first Ghanaian FA Cup win and led them to a 4th place finish by the end of the 2012–13 Ghanaian Premier League season. 

He later served as the assistant coach to Hans van der Pluijm from 2013 to 2015. In November 2015, he was promoted to the position of technical director for the club, serving in that role from 2015 to 2017. He served as interim coach after Tom Strand left the club, and later doubled as head coach of the club and technical director from 2016 to 2017 especially during the 2017 Ghanaian Premier League. During his 4-year period with the club as interim head coach, assistant coach and technical director, he helped the club to win two Ghanaian FA Cup in 2013 and 2015 and the Ghana Super Cup in 2017.

Ghana national teams 
Adotey served as coach for the Ghana women's national under-17 football team, the Black Maidens from 2014 to 2019, in the process leading the team to three consecutive quarter-final place in three FIFA U-17 Women's World Cup campaigns. In January 2020, he was appointed as the 1st assistant coach of the Ghana national under-20 football team to Abdul-Karim Zito.

Karela United 
On 14 April 2020, Karela United announced the appointment of Adotey as the team's new head coach succeeding Enos Adepa who had left the club via a mutual agreement in March. With the club sitting in the 17th on the 2019–20 Ghana Premier League table with 11 points after a 15-game run that saw them win only two league matches while losing 7 and drawing 4 before the league was suspended in March 2020, due to the Coronavirus pandemic, his main task was to push the club out of the relegation zone should the league resume. The league was later cancelled in July 2020. 

In February 2021, he was adjudged coach of the month for January 2021, with Karela United striker Diawisie Taylor also winning the player of the month after an impressive performance with the club winning 3 matches, drawing 1 match and losing 1 match out of 5 matches within the month of January.

Honours

Manager 
Medeama SC

 Ghanaian FA Cup: 2013, 2015
Individual
 Ghanaian FA Cup Coach of the Year: 2013
 Ghana Premier League Manager of the Month: January 2021

References

External links 

 
 

Living people
Ghanaian football managers
Medeama S.C. managers
Karela United FC managers
1964 births
Ghana Premier League managers